The Aeolus was manufactured in England by the Bown Manufacturing Company between 1903 and 1905, and featured a 492cc single-cylinder engine with shaft drive to the rear wheel. Production was on a limited scale.

References

Goods manufactured in England
Vehicles introduced in 1903
1903 establishments in England
Motorcycles introduced in the 1900s
British companies established in 1903